CARE Super (stylised CareSuper) is an Australian industry superannuation fund, focussing on superannuation for people engaged in professional, managerial, administration and service occupations. Established in 1986, CareSuper now services over 245,000 members Australia-wide and has over $19.7 billion in funds under management.

Industry superannuation fund
As an industry super fund, CareSuper is run only to profit members. Unlike many insurance company and bank owned super funds, industry funds are not in business to make a profit for shareholders.

History
Formerly the ‘Clerical, Administrative and Related Employees Superannuation Plan’, CareSuper was established in 1986 as one of the early industry superannuation funds in Australia to meet award super requirements. 
In the new year of 1987, companies were invited to participate in CareSuper, the first to join was Siemens Limited.

In 1999, CareSuper became a public offer fund, enabling non employer-sponsored individuals to join the CareSuper Personal Plan.

In July 2007, CareSuper introduced a Pension product, allowing members to stay with the fund as they move towards or commence retirement.

Brand ambassador
In 2011, retired Australian swimmer Giaan Rooney became the face of CareSuper. As CareSuper's brand ambassador, she regularly features in CareSuper's television advertisements and events.

Merger with Asset Super
It was announced in September 2011 that the then $4.9 billion fund CareSuper and $1.6 billion fund Asset Super were in talks to conduct a merger of the two funds.

The merger was completed on 27 October 2012, with 4 Trustee Directors from Asset joining the existing 9 Trustee Directors on the Board of CareSuper.

References

Superannuation funds in Australia
Australian companies established in 1986